Saritha Cham Nong (born ) is a Malaysian female compound archer and part of the national team. She won the bronze medal at the 2015 Asian Archery Championships in the women's team event.

References

1988 births
Living people
Malaysian female archers
People from Perak
Malaysian people of Thai descent
Place of birth missing (living people)
Archers at the 2010 Commonwealth Games
Archers at the 2018 Asian Games
Asian Games competitors for Malaysia
Commonwealth Games competitors for Malaysia